Kin Klizhin is a small house in the Chaco Canyon, approximately  southwest of Pueblo Bonito. It dates to the 1080s. It consists of "16 rooms, two kivas, a tower kiva, and an enclosed plaza". The Kin Klizhin Wash flows in the vicinity, which was used to provide irrigation to nearby fields. The site remains unexcavated.

References

Chaco Culture National Historical Park